São Martinho das Amoreiras is a Portuguese parish in the municipality of Odemira. The population in 2011 was 1,006, in an area of 144.17 km2.

References

Freguesias of Odemira